Mount Hale is the name of more than one mountain, including:

 Mount Hale (Antarctica), a peak in the Sentinel Range, Antarctica
 Mount Hale (California), in the Sierra Nevada, USA
 Mount Hale (New Hampshire) in the White Mountains of New Hampshire, USA